Hexagonia hydnoides is a species of fungus in the Polyporaceae family. It is a plant pathogen. This fungus is largely saprophytic, decaying dead wood tissues.

References 

Fungal plant pathogens and diseases
Polyporaceae
Fungi described in 1806